Gibberella cyanogena is a fungal plant pathogen.

References

External links 
 Index Fungorum
 USDA ARS Fungal Database

Fungal plant pathogens and diseases
cyanogena
Fungi described in 1883
Taxa named by John Baptiste Henri Joseph Desmazières